Maximiliano Ramón Martínez (born 1 September 1992) is an Argentine professional footballer who plays as a left-back for Mitre.

Career
Martínez's senior career began with San Martín (T), who signed him from Newell's Old Boys in 2008. Pedro Monzón promoted him into their first-team squad during the 2010–11 Primera B Nacional, in which competition he made his professional debut during a home loss to Instituto on 30 April 2011; having been an unused substitute on three previous occasions. San Martín were relegated to Torneo Argentino A in 2010–11, he subsequently made seventeen appearances which preceded a loan move to Torneo Argentino B's Atlético Concepción in 2012. He went on to play in twenty matches and score one goal.

He returned to San Martín a year later, prior to having two full seasons of action with them in Torneo Argentino A/Torneo Federal A. On 19 January 2015, Martínez joined All Boys of Primera B Nacional on loan. He would remain for three seasons, featuring in seventy-two fixtures. Martínez was back with his parent club for the 2017–18 Primera B Nacional campaign, which ended with promotion via the play-offs to the Primera División. His first appearance in top-flight football arrived against Unión Santa Fe on 20 August 2018. In July 2019, Martínez moved to San Martín's namesakes from San Juan.

However, Martínez never participated in a competitive match after picking up an injury, which required surgery, soon after signing. October 2020 saw Martínez return to San Miguel de Tucumán with former club San Martín.

Career statistics
.

References

External links

1992 births
Living people
Sportspeople from San Miguel de Tucumán
Argentine footballers
Association football fullbacks
Primera Nacional players
Torneo Argentino B players
Torneo Argentino A players
Torneo Federal A players
Argentine Primera División players
San Martín de Tucumán footballers
All Boys footballers
San Martín de San Juan footballers
Club Atlético Mitre footballers